Peter Early Love (July 7, 1818 – November 8, 1866) was an American politician, lawyer and jurist.

Born in Dublin, Georgia, in 1818, Love attended Franklin College, the founding college of the University of Georgia in Athens, where he was a member of the Phi Kappa Literary Society and graduated in 1829. He then graduated from the Philadelphia College of Medicine in 1838 and became a practicing physician. During this time, Love also studied law and was admitted to the Georgia state bar in 1839. He began practicing law in Thomasville, Georgia.

In 1842, Love became the solicitor general for the southern district of Georgia. In 1849, he was elected to the Georgia Senate. In 1853, Love became a superior court judge in the southern circuit. Love was elected in 1858 as a Democrat to represent Georgia's 1st congressional district in the United States House of Representatives for the 36th Congress. After resigning near the end of that term, Love returned to practicing law in Thomasville. He won election to the Georgia House of Representatives in 1861. Love died in Thomasville on November 8, 1866, and was buried in that city's Old Cemetery.

References 

1818 births
1866 deaths
Democratic Party members of the Georgia House of Representatives
Democratic Party Georgia (U.S. state) state senators
Georgia (U.S. state) lawyers
Georgia (U.S. state) state court judges
University of Georgia alumni
Democratic Party members of the United States House of Representatives from Georgia (U.S. state)
People from Dublin, Georgia
People from Thomasville, Georgia
American slave owners
19th-century American politicians
19th-century American judges
19th-century American lawyers